Amyna apicalis is a moth of the family Noctuidae. It is found in Queensland.

External links
Australian Faunal Directory

Moths of Queensland
Eustrotiinae
Moths described in 1865